The Irish Singles Chart ranks the best-performing singles in Ireland, as compiled by Chart-Track on behalf of the Irish Recorded Music Association.

Number-one artists

See also
 List of number-one albums of 2015 (Ireland)

References

Number-one singles
Ireland
2015